The Sacramento Valley is the area of the Central Valley of the U.S. state of California that lies north of the Sacramento–San Joaquin River Delta and is drained by the Sacramento River. It encompasses all or parts of ten Northern California counties. Although many areas of the Sacramento Valley are rural, it contains several urban areas, including the state capital, Sacramento. Since 2010, statewide droughts in California have further strained both the Sacramento Valley's and the Sacramento metropolitan region's water security.

Geography
The Sacramento River and its tributaries are a significant part of the geography of the Sacramento Valley. Rising in the various mountain ranges (the various Northern Coast Ranges to the west, the southern Siskiyou Mountains to the north, and the northern Sierra Nevada to the east) that define the shape of the valley, they provide water for agricultural, industrial, residential, and recreation uses. Most of the rivers are heavily dammed and diverted. In more recent years, statewide droughts in California have further strained the Sacramento Valley's water security.

The terrain of the Sacramento Valley is primarily flat grasslands that become lusher as one moves east from the rain shadow of the Coast Ranges toward the Sierra. Unlike the San Joaquin Valley, which in its pre-irrigation state was a vegetation-hostile desert, the somewhat less arid Sacramento Valley had significant tracts of forest prior to the arrival of settlers of European ancestry. Most of it was cut down during the California Gold Rush and the ensuing wave of American settlement, although there are still some heavily tree-populated areas, such as the greater Sacramento area.

Foothills become more common from just south of Corning to Shasta Lake City. These are known as the Valley Hills and begin south of the Tehama-Glenn County line near Corning. There are also a few hills in Red Bluff and Corning. There is one major range of foothills between Cottonwood and Red Bluff known as the Cottonwood Hills (a.k.a. 9-mile Hill), and there is the Cottonwood Ridge between Anderson and Cottonwood. There are some hills in Redding, a few more than Red Bluff, and north of Redding it is mainly foothills.

One distinctive geographic feature of the Sacramento Valley is the Sutter Buttes. Nicknamed the smallest mountain range in the world, it consists of the remnants of an extinct volcano and is located just outside Yuba City, 44 miles north of Sacramento.

Agriculture

Citrus and nut orchards and cattle ranches are common to both halves of the Central Valley. The Sacramento Valley's agricultural industry also resembles that of the San Joaquin Valley to the south. Nuts, such as almonds and walnuts, are of greater importance north of the Delta, and rice, nonviable in the drier San Joaquin Valley, is a major crop. The town of Corning produces olives for oil extraction and for consumption as fruit. The Sunsweet Growers Incorporated headquarters are in Yuba City. The valley controls more than two-thirds of the worldwide prune market through the over 400 growers in California.

Climate
Weather patterns in the Sacramento Valley are very similar to those in the San Joaquin Valley to the south, although the humidity and precipitation tend to be a bit higher. Summers are the dry season, with average daytime temperatures in the low to high 90s °F (low to mid 30s °C) but triple digits (38 °C and above) are a common occurrence, especially in Chico, Redding, Red Bluff, and Sacramento. The "breeze", which comes in from the Bay area, brings cooler temperatures and higher humidity. At times the delta breeze is gusty with wind speed to up to 30 mph (50 km/h) in the valley and up to 45 mph (75 km/h) in the delta region which is often breezy. This breeze can also bring morning low clouds at times into the region, but the clouds generally burn off quickly and temperatures stay cool. Summer-like conditions continue into early to mid-September but weather starts to change to cooler, wetter, foggier weather during October which gives trees vibrant autumn foliage. Winters, also known as the rainy season, are generally mild to cool, foggy and wet. Up north, the temperature averages in the mid-40s °F (mid-to-high single digits °C) and lows reaching to the low-10s °F (-10 to -12 °C), colder in the northern part of the valley and colder still in the foothills and frost can occur almost anywhere. Farther south near Sacramento, temperatures tend to stay between the low-50s and high-60s °F (10-20 °C), with nighttime temperatures dropping to the mid-30s and 40s °F (1-7 °C). The rainy season runs from November to early-April.
During the rainy season, the Sacramento Valley is prone to strong thunderstorms and tornadoes, mostly of EF0 or EF1 intensity, especially in Colusa County and areas around Corning and Orland. Flooding does occur at times during wetter periods, usually November to March. Snow in the valley is rare, although Redding and Red Bluff, being at the north end of the valley, often experience a light dusting or two per year. Chico may get a rain-snow mix every few years, but, on the average, only snows about every 5 years. Farther south in Sacramento, snow rarely occurs. During the autumn and winter months, the entire Central Valley is susceptible to dense tule fog that makes driving hazardous, especially at night and especially south of Corning. The fog can last for weeks depending on how weak the wind is. In more recent years, statewide droughts in California have further strained both the Sacramento Valley's and the San Joaquin Valley's water security.

Transportation

Interstate 5 is the primary route through the Sacramento Valley, traveling north–south roughly along the valley's western edge. Interstate 80 cuts a northeast-to-southwest swath through the southern end of the valley, mostly through Sacramento and Yolo Counties, and ends at the San Francisco-Oakland Bay Bridge. Several secondary routes connect the two roads, including Interstate 505 and State Route 113. The Sacramento area has a web of urban freeways.

Other principal routes in the region include State Route 99, which runs along the valley's eastern edge, roughly parallel to I-5, from Sacramento until its northern terminus in Red Bluff; State Route 20, which traverses the valley from west to east on its route from State Route 1 in Mendocino County to the Donner Pass; State Route 49, named in honor of the California Gold Rush and running through many old mining towns in the foothills of the valley; and State Route 45, which runs along the course of the Sacramento River roughly ten miles (20 km) east of I-5.

The Union Pacific Railroad serves the valley, with its principal north–south line from Oakland, California to Portland, Oregon, via Sacramento, Marysville, Chico, and Redding.  This is also the route of Amtrak's Coast Starlight passenger train.  The Union Pacific also has two east–west lines, through Donner Pass (the former Central Pacific Railroad), and through the Feather River gorge (the former Western Pacific Railroad).  Amtrak's California Zephyr uses the Donner Pass route. The BNSF Railway has a line from Klamath Falls, Oregon, to a junction with the Union Pacific Feather River line at Keddie.  The BNSF has trackage rights on both the UP east–west routes.  In addition, the California Northern Railroad operates the former Southern Pacific Railroad line on the west side of the valley from Davis to Tehama (near Red Bluff).

Educational institutions

University of California, Davis
California State University, Chico
California State University, Sacramento
Simpson University, in Redding
William Jessup University, in Rocklin
McGeorge School of Law in Sacramento
American River College, in Sacramento
Butte College, in Oroville
Cosumnes River College, in Sacramento
Folsom Lake College, in Folsom
Sacramento City College, in Sacramento
Shasta College, in Redding
Sierra College, in Rocklin
Solano Community College, Vacaville Center, in Vacaville
Woodland Community College, in Woodland
Yuba Community College, in Marysville

Professional sports teams

National Basketball Association (NBA)
Sacramento Kings

Pacific Coast League (minor league baseball)
Sacramento River Cats

Independent Women's Football League
Sacramento Sirens

Women's Premier Soccer League
California Storm
Sacramento Pride

United Soccer League (USL)
Sacramento Republic

Cities

Cities with over 500,000 inhabitants
Sacramento

Cities with 100,000 to 400,000 inhabitants
Chico
Elk Grove
Roseville
Vacaville

Cities with 50,000 to 100,000 inhabitants
Citrus Heights
Davis
Folsom
Rancho Cordova
Redding
Rocklin
West Sacramento
Woodland
Yuba City

Cities with 10,000 to 50,000 inhabitants
Anderson
Dixon
Galt
Lincoln
Marysville
Oroville
Red Bluff
Shasta Lake

Cities with under 10,000 inhabitants
Biggs
Colusa
Corning
Gridley
Isleton
Live Oak
Loomis
Orland
Paradise
Rio Vista
Sutter
Tehama
Wheatland
Williams
Willows
Winters

See also

 Sacramento Valley Museum
 Sacramento Valley Railroad (1852–77)
 Sacramento Valley and Eastern Railway (1908–1930s)
 Leonard M. Landsborough (ca. 1858–1927) — Sacramento Valley landowner and legislator for the area.
 John Buttencourt Avila — father of the sweet potato industry.
 Sacramento Valley National Cemetery

Notes

References

 
Regions of California
Valleys of Butte County, California
Valleys of California
Valleys of Colusa County, California
Valleys of Glenn County, California
Valleys of Placer County, California
Valleys of Sacramento County, California
Valleys of Shasta County, California
Valleys of Sutter County, California
Valleys of Tehama County, California
Valleys of Yolo County, California
Valleys of Yuba County, California